This is a list of horses and ponies in fictional subjects, excluding hybrid fantasy creatures such as centaurs and unicorns but including pegasi; their cousins, donkeys and zebras; and cross-breed mules and zebroids.

Horses in literature

Abelard, Halt's trained small horse/pony in the Ranger's Apprentice series by John Flanagan
Acorn, Davy's horse in the Chaos Walking series by Patrick Ness
Albino, from Thunderhead by Mary O'Hara
Alfonso (or, in Swedish, Lilla Gubben), in the Pippi Longstocking series by Astrid Lindgren
Angharrad, Todd's horse in the Chaos Walking trilogy by Patrick Ness
Appalachian, from Thunderhead by Mary O'Hara 
Arondel, Bevis's horse in the Middle English romance Bevis of Hampton
Artax, Atreyu's horse in Michael Ende's The Neverending Story
Asfaloth, Glorfindel's horse in The Lord of the Rings by J.R.R Tolkien
Arod, Legolas's horse in The Lord of the RingsAthansor, ridden by Peter Lake in Mark Helprin's A Winter's TaleAzarax, from The Byerley Turk by Jeremy James
Azul, the Blue Horse, from The Alchemical Horseman, by Jeremy James
Banner, from My Friend Flicka by Mary O'Hara
Barnum and Skip, the Wilders' driving team of Laura Ingalls Wilder's Little House books and The First Four YearsBela, originally owned by Tam al'Thor, and later by Egwene al'Vere, in The Wheel of Time series
Bess and Beauty, two work horses from Farmer Boy by Laura Ingalls Wilder
Binky, ridden by Death in Terry Pratchett's Discworld novels
Bill the Pony, pack pony for the Fellowship of the Ring in Lord of the Rings.
Black Beauty, from Black Beauty by Anna Sewell
Black Boy and Rapide, Jill Crewe's ponies from the series by Ruby Ferguson (in later editions, "Black Boy" became "Best Boy")
Black Gold, from Black Gold by Marguerite Henry
The Black (Stallion), from a series of 21 books by Walter Farley beginning with The Black Stallion (1941)
Blackjack, from Rick Riordan's Percy Jackson & the Olympians series
Blaze, from a series of children's books by Clarence William Anderson, beginning with Billy and Blaze (1936)
Bless, Goldmund's childhood horse in Narcissus and Goldmund by Hermann Hesse
Blessing, Celeste's first horse in The Secret Horse by Gina Bertaina
Boxer, Mollie, and Clover, from Animal Farm by George Orwell
Bree Hee Hinny Brinny Hoohy Hah ("Bree"), from The Horse and His Boy by C. S. Lewis
Bright Country, Prince Eadric's horse from The Tales of the Frog Princess series by E.D. Baker
Bronze, the Steel General's horse in Roger Zelazny's Creatures of Light and DarknessCadoc, from Christopher Paolini's EragonCapilet, Sir Andrew's Ague Cheek's horse in William Shakespeare's Twelfth Night, Act 3, Scene 4
Castor, one of the team of Shire horses owned by farmer Dawson in The Dark Is Rising Sequence by Susan Cooper
Chretienne, a horse from The Malloreon by David Eddings
Cigarette, from My Friend Flicka by Mary O'Hara
Cloud, the pony owned by Veralidaine Sarrasri, and other ponies, in The Immortals quartet by Tamora Pierce
'Companions', which are human spirits reincarnated in the form of white horses in Mercedes Lackey's Valdemar series
Condor, the mount of Green Rider Karigan G'ladheon in Kristen Britain's Green Rider series
Dagobaz, Ash's horse from The Far Pavilions by M. M. Kaye
Dilu, the mount of Chinese warlord Liu Bei in the Romance of the Three Kingdoms, attributed to Luo Guanzhong
Drinny, the Ranyhyn mount of Lord Mhoram in Stephen R. Donaldson's The Chronicles of Thomas CovenantFaran, Sparhawk's horse in David Eddings' series The Elenium and The TamuliFerd, Carli's telepathic horse in Bertil Mårtensson's This is Reality (Swedish: Detta är verkligheten)
Figure, Justin Morgan's stallion and foundation sire of the Morgan horse breed, Justin Morgan Had a Horse by Marguerite Henry
Flame, from The Black Stallion series
Flicka, from My Friend Flicka by Mary O'Hara
Florian, from Felix Salten's novel Florian: The Emperor’s StallionFru-Fru, from Anna Karenina by Leo Tolstoy
Fury, from the original story by Norman Krasna, 1936, made into a movie the same year
Gabilan, from John Steinbeck's novel The Red PonyGlory, from Gene Markey's short story and made into a movie, 1956
Ginger, from Black Beauty by Anna Sewell
Glue-Boy, Cuthbert Allgood's horse from the Dark Tower series by Stephen King
The "great horses" owned by Angus Morton in The Chrysalids, the result of an officially sanctioned breeding program; technically, mutants
Greatheart, Beauty's horse from Robin McKinley's novel BeautyGuido, a Pegasus from Rick Riordan's "Percy Jackson"
Gulliver, narrator of Horseplay by Lee Siegel
Gunpowder, Ichabod Crane's horse from The Legend of Sleepy Hollow by Washington Irving
Gypsy, from Gypsy from Nowhere by Sharon Wagner
Hatatitla, Old Shatterhand's horse in Karl May's WinnetouHell Bitch, from Lonesome Dove by Larry McMurtry
Highboy, from My Friend FlickaThe Houyhnhnms, a race of intelligent and cultured horses in Gulliver's Travels by Jonathan Swift
Hwin, from The Horse and His Boy by C. S. Lewis
Iltschi, Winnetou's horse
Captain Jinks' horse, of the Horse Marines, fed on corn and beans in the nursery rhyme
Jim, cab-horse from Dorothy and the Wizard in Oz by L. Frank Baum
Joey, from War Horse by Michael Morpurgo
Kate and Bill, the Wilders' work horses in Laura Ingalls Wilder's The First Four YearsKholstomer, from the story of the same name by Leo Tolstoy
Lark, from The Berserker's Horse by Lisa Maxwell
Lukas, in the Emil i Lönneberga series by Astrid Lindgren
Mehryl, the Ranyhyn mount of Hile Troy in Stephen R. Donaldson's The Chronicles of Thomas CovenantMerrylegs, from Black Beauty by Anna Sewell
Miramis, with golden mane and hooves, from Astrid Lindgren's book Mio, My SonMisty of Chincoteague, a real pony made famous by Marguerite Henry's children's book of the same name
Myrha, the Ranyhyn mount of High Lord Elena in Stephen R. Donaldson's The Chronicles of Thomas CovenantMonarch, from Jodie's Journey by Colin Thiele
Moonlight, the horse owned by Alanna of Trebond in the Song of the Lioness quartet by Tamora Pierce
Morgenstern, Julian's horse from the Chronicles of Amber by Roger Zelazny
Nana, the racehorse named for the eponymous heroine of Zola's novel Nana, and fictional winner of the Grand Prix de Paris
Napoleon, from The Black StallionNara, a Hunnuli or magical horse, from The Dark Horse series by Mary H. Herbert
Oberon, the "ghost pony" Sarah Elgin finds the remains of in an old stone house, in Lynn Hall's The Mystery of Pony HollowPeachblossom, the horse owned by Keladry in the Protector of the Small quartet by Tamora Pierce
Persephone from House of Night by P. C. Cast and Kristin Cast
The Phantom, Misty's dam, Misty of Chincoteague by Marguerite Henry
The Pie, from National Velvet by Enid Bagnold
Pied Piper, sire of Misty, in Misty of Chincoteague by Marguerite Henry
Pildarlick, one of Panhandle Smith's first horses in Zane Grey's short story "Valley of Wild Horses"
Pilgrim from The Horse Whisperer by Nicholas Evans and the film based on it
Pips, Matrim Cauthon's horse in Robert Jordan's Wheel of TimePollux, one of the team of Shire horses owned by farmer Dawson in The Dark Is Rising Sequence by Susan Cooper
Porkpie, a Pegasus from Rick Riordan's  "Percy Jackson"
Prairie horses, from The HorseclansPrince and Lady, Almanzo Wilder's Morgan horse driving team of Laura Ingalls Wilder's Little House books
Pylon, Susan's horse from the Dark Tower series by Stephen King
Rakhsh, Rostam's horse in ShahnamehRed Hare, the mount of Lü Bu and Guan Yu in the Chinese epic Romance of the Three KingdomsRih, Kara Ben Nemsi's horse in Karl May's tales of the Orient
Rival, wild stallion hero of Saddle a Thunderbolt by Jo Sykes
Roach, the name that Geralt of Rivia, from The Witcher series by Polish writer Andrzej Sapkowski, gives to all his horses
Rochallor, Fingolfin's horse in The Silmarillion by J.R.R Tolkien edited by Christopher Tolkien.
Rocinante, from Don Quixote by Miguel de Cervantes; also the name of fictional horses in several other books and movies
Rocket, Flicka's dam, from My Friend Flicka by Mary O'Hara
Rusher, Roland's horse from the Dark Tower series by Stephen King
Sam and David, the Ingalls family work horses of Laura Ingalls Wilder's Little House on the PrairieSea Star from Sea Star: Orphan of ChincoteagueScipio, from Rick Riordan's Heroes of Olympus series
Secret, from Gina Bertaina's The Secret HorseShadowfax, the horse ridden by Gandalf the White in J.R.R. Tolkien's Lord of the RingsSham from King of the Wind by Marguerite Henry
Silver Blaze, from the Sherlock Holmes stories by Arthur Conan Doyle
Sir Chess, the Knight Destrier, in Linda Medley's Castle WaitingSmiler, Theon Greyjoy's warhorse from A Song of Ice and Fire by George R. R. Martin
Smoky, from Smoky the Cow Horse, written and illustrated by Will James
Snowfire, from Christopher Paolini's EragonStardust, from Ashleigh's Hope by Joanna Campbell
Starlight from Farmer Boy by Laura Ingalls Wilder
Stayer and Stepper, Perrin's horses in The Wheel of Time series
Stormy, from Stormy, Misty's Foal by Marguerite Henry
Stranger, Sandor Clegane's warhorse from A Song of Ice and Fire by George R. R. Martin
Sunchaser from The Unicorns Of Balinor by Mary Stanton
Sunfire, from Ravenheart and Sorrowheart by Kendra Ann Thomas
Sunka Wakan, from The Great Spirit Horse by Linda Little Wolf
Sunstorm, from Ashleigh's Hope by Joanna Campbell
Talat, Aerin's horse in The Hero and the Crown by Robin McKinley
Tencendur, Charlemagne's warhorse in The Song of RolandThowra, a creamy-silver stallion, the main character in Silver Brumby, by Elyne Mitchell
Thunderhead, son of Flicka in the book by Mary O'Hara
Topthorn, from War Horse by Michael Morpurgo
Tornac, from Christopher Paolini's EragonTrojan Horse (a structure), from Virgil's Aeneid; Homer's The Odyssey; Franco Brusati's Ulysses; Hugh Gray's The Treatment of Helen of Troy; Margaret George's Helen of Troy; and Adele Geres' TroyTrotsky, Mrs. Piggle-Wiggle's horse in the books by Betty MacDonald
Tsornin (Sungold), Harry Crewe's horse in The Blue Sword by Robin McKinley
Tug, Will's trained small horse/pony in the Ranger's Apprentice series by John Flanagan
Veillantif (also called Brigliadoro), Roland's horse in the chansons de gesteWatch Eyes, pony of Paul and Maureen Beebe, characters in Misty of Chincoteague by Marguerite Henry
Whinney and her offspring, Racer and Grey, from the Earth's Children books
Whirlwind from Shadow Horse by Alison Hart
Wings, sire of Stormy, in  Stormy, Misty's Foal by Marguerite Henry

Horses in mythology and folklore
Dora, a war horse of Đurađ Senković
Dyaus Pita, the Sky Father, who appears as a horse
Embarr, Niamh and Lugh's horse
Epona, Gaulish horse goddess
Grey of Macha, or Macha's Grey, CúChulainn's chariot horse; known as the king of all horses
Gringolet, Sir Gawain's horse
Hengroen, King Arthur's horse
The horse of Sinterklaas: in the Netherlands "Amerigo" or "Ozosnel", in Flanders "Slechtweervandaag" ("Bad weather today")
Jabučilo, horse of Momčilo
Kelpie, a mythical Celtic water horse
Liath Macha and Dub Sainglend, Cúchulainn's horses
Llamrei, King Arthur's mare
Morvarc'h, the horse of Gradlon in Breton legend
The Nuckelavee, an Orcadian horse with no skin which sometimes appears to have a man astride its body
Ros Beiaard, a horse from Belgian folklore, still celebrated annually in many cities across the country.
Rowan Benda, an urban legend
Šarac, horse of Prince Marko
Silili, a Babylonian king of horses
Sivko-Burko, the "Gray-Brown" Horse of Slavic folktales
Tikbalang, the demon horse in Philippine folklore
Tulpar, the winged or swift horse in Turkic mythology 
Uchchaihshravas, Indra's horse in Hindu mythology
White horse of Kent
Widow-Maker / Lightning, mythical cowboy Pecos Bill's horse
Ždralin, horse of Miloš Obilić
Zelenko, horse of Damjan Jugović

Horses in Greek mythology
Arion, an immortal, extremely swift horse
Balius and Xanthos, Achilles' horses
Hippocampus, a sea horse that pulled Poseidon's chariot
Mares of Diomedes, which fed on human flesh
Pegasus, flying horse of Greek mythology
Phaethon, one of the two immortal steeds of the dawn-goddess Eos
Rhaebus, the horse of Mezentius in Roman myths
Sterope, horse of the sun-god Helios
Trojan Horse
Equuleus, Hippe transformed into a foal (now a constellation)

Horses in Norse mythology
Árvakr and Alsviðr pulled Sól's chariot
Falhófnir, a horse in Norse mythology
Glad, a horse in Norse mythology
Glær, a horse listed in both the Grímnismál and GylfaginningGulltoppr, the horse of Heimdallr in Norse myths
Hofvarpnir, horse of the goddess Gná in Norse myths
Hrimfaxi, Nótt's horse in Norse myths
The Night Mare, a horse summoned by a Finnish sorceress to kill king Vanlandi in the Heimskringla
Skinfaxi, Dagur's horse in Norse myths
Sleipnir, Odin's eight-legged horse in Norse myths
Svadilfari, the giant stallion that fathered Sleipnir

Horses in film

Aldebaran, Antares, Rigel and Altair from Ben-Hur (one of four from the chariot race)
April Love, from April Love (1957)
Artax, Atreyu's Horse from The NeverEnding StoryBad Horse, from Dr. Horrible's Sing-Along BlogBeau, from True Grit with John Wayne
Beric, Lancelot's horse, from Knights of the Round Table with Robert Taylor 
Big John, from For Richer or PoorerThe Black Stallion, from The Black Stallion and The Black Stallion Returns, based on Walter Farley's books; played by the Arabian stallion Cass Ole
The Young Black Stallion from The Young Black Stallion film based on Walter Farley's book.
Blue Boy, race horse from Laurel and Hardy's 1929 comedy short, Wrong AgainBucephalus, from The Adventures of Baron Munchausen and AlexanderCheckers, from Moondance AlexanderCisco, John Dunbar's buckskin gelding from Dances with WolvesCochise, the Appaloosa stallion ridden by John Wayne in the movie El DoradoConquistador, the General's horse stolen and rescued by Pablito from The Littlest OutlawCopper, one of the horses ridden by Eddie Dean in his films
Denny, the buckskin gelding of The Man From Snowy River (also appeared in the sequel, The Man from Snowy River II)
Diablo, the black and white pinto from the Cisco Kid movies
Dollar, the horse of John Wayne's character (John Bernard "J.B." Books) in The Shootist, 1976
Don, talking horse from Hot to TrotDover, race horse from My Fair Lady (does not appear on screen)
Flash, from FlashFlicka, from Flicka (based on the book My Friend Flicka)
Ginger, from Black BeautyGoliath, from LadyhawkeGulliver, from The Horse Whisperer book and film of the same name
Gunpowder, Constable Ichabod Crane's horse in the film The Legend of Sleepy HollowGypsy, Meggie MacWade's horse, which undertakes a 500-mile journey over treacherous terrain to be reunited with her in Gypsy ColtHidalgo, paint stallion from the movie of the same name (disputed)
The Horse of a Different Color, from The Wizard of OzJoey, from the movie War HorseLittle Blackie, from the John Wayne film True GritLucky Number Slevin, from the movie of the same name
Khartoum, the ill-fated horse from The GodfatherMaximus, horse featured in the animated film TangledNapoleon, Snoe's gray cart horse and The Black's stable mate in the film The Black StallionNurah and Thebes, the horses of Pharaoh Ramses from Cecil B. DeMille's 1956 The Ten CommandmentsOliver Hardy, at the end of Flying Deuces; after he died in a plane crash, he was reincarnated as a horse
Pepper, from Two Bits and Pepper (1995)
Phillip, Edmund's horse from The Lion, the Witch and the WardrobePie, Velvet Brown's horse from National VelvetPilgrim, troubled, injured horse from The Horse Whisperer book and movie
Shadowfax from Lord of the Rings: the Fellowship of the Ring (2001)
Sonny, Joe's horse in My Outlaw BrotherSpirit, buckskin stallion from Spirit: Stallion of the CimarronSprout, from The Parent TrapSylvester, from Sylvester (1985)
Taff/Bo, the main horse character in Disney's Ride a Wild PonyTír na nÓg from Into the WestTolo, gelding from The Long ShotTrigger, Roy Rogers' horse.
Two Bits, from Two Bits and Pepper (1995)

Horses in television
Alípio, from puppet series CocoricóAmigo, Cordell Walker's horse in the TV series Walker, Texas RangerArgo, from Xena: Warrior PrincessBandit, buckskin from Caitlin's WayThe Black Stallion in Adventures of the Black StallionBlue Jeans, Miley Stewart's horse in Hannah MontanaBuck, the buckskin horse of Ben Cartwright on the TV series BonanzaBuck, the buckskin horse ridden by Trampas in the TV series The VirginianChampion the Wonder Horse, the eponymous hero of a 1950s television series
Chestnut, from the TV series 2 Broke GirlsChico, also his real name, Queen of Swords horse
Chub, Chubb, or Chubby, the horse of Hoss Cartwright on the Bonanza television series
Cochise, Little Joe's horse on the Bonanza television series
Cocoa, Nick Barkley's horse on The Big Valley TV series (Cocoa was retired at the end of the Hunter's Moon episode in Season Four)
Domino, the pinto ridden by Bill Longley, played by Rory Calhoun in The Texan TV series
Fury, the eponymous black stallion of the 1950s TV series
Hercules, Steptoe and Sons horse
Joe D., the horse ridden by the Virginian in the TV series The VirginianKaty, the paint mare belonging to The Kid from The Young RidersLi'l Sebastian, the little horse beloved by Pawnee, Indiana in the sitcom Parks and RecreationMister Ed, eponymous horse of the CBS series, 1961–1966.
Meindert het Paard, a horse who is a character in the Dutch TV children's puppet series De Fabeltjeskrant.
Pie-O-My, Ralph Cifaretto's horse from Episodes 44 and 48 of Season 4 of The SopranosPhantom, Zorro's white horse in the Disney series ZorroPokey, the pony from The Gumby ShowPolka-Dotted Horse, Ludicrous Lion's horse from H.R. PufnstufRingo, the black horse with the white star ridden by Josh Randall in all but the first few episodes of the TV series Wanted Dead or AliveSaddle Club horses from The Saddle ClubScout, Tonto's horse
Silver, the Lone Ranger's horse
Sophie, Colonel Potter's horse on M*A*S*HSpartan, Amy Fleming's horse from HeartlandSport, the chestnut gelding of Adam Cartwright on the television series BonanzaSuperstar, the real name of the black horse who played James West's horse in the TV series The Wild Wild WestTornado, Zorro's black horse
Victor, the Lone Ranger's nephew's horse
Wildfire, from ABC Family's WildfireHorses in animation
Achilles, horse of Captain Phoebus in Disney's The Hunchback of Notre DameAltivo, Cortez's warhorse from DreamWorks' The Road to El DoradoAngus, horse of Merida in Disney's BraveBoJack Horseman, the titular alcoholic celebrity horse in BoJack HorsemanBucephalus, demon-horse of Alexander the Great from Reign: The ConquerorBuck, the sheriff's horse from Home on the RangeBullseye, Woody's horse in Toy Story 2 and Toy Story 3Captain, the authoritative farm horse in Disney's 101 DalmatiansChet, from The Littlest Pet ShopCyril Proudbottom, Toad's helpful but clumsy horse friend in Disney's The Adventures of Ichabod and Mr. ToadDe Royal, Double Eight, Chestnut, Mikagehomare, Miyako, and Rosanna from Silver SpoonDeablo the Horse, from Johnny Bravo.
Donny the White Horse, Bubbles' friend in the reboot of The Powerpuff Girls.
Frou-Frou, from AristocatsFun Saiki, from Mobile Fighter G GundamGallopin' GalsHorace Horsecollar from the Walt Disney cartoons
Horse, Dudley Do-Right's horse in The Rocky and Bullwinkle Show
Ico, from Ico, el Caballito valienteJames Baxter, from Adventure Time
Jean Kirstein, from Attack on Titan
Khan, the Fa family's horse from Disney's MulanLightning, from Dinozaurs: The SeriesMajesty, from Barbie & Her Sisters in A Pony TaleMajor, from Cinderella (1950 film).
Maximus, the horse who pursued Flynn Rider in Disney's TangledMr. Horse from Ren and StimpyMy Little Pony: Friendship Is MagicNoble Heart Horse, a Care Bears Cousin from the television series and films
Opal, in Ribon no KishiPharfignewton, Pinky's girlfriend on Animaniacs and Pinky and the BrainPhillipe, Belle and her father's horse from Disney's Beauty and the BeastPony Puff Princess, Dee Dee's idol in Dexter's LaboratoryPonycorn, from Bomberman B-Daman BakugaidenPonygon and his parents, Kardio from Zatch Bell!
Princess, Lisa's horse in The SimpsonsQuick Draw McGraw, of Hanna-Barbera's cartoon series
Rain, the paint mare from Spirit: Stallion of the CimarronSabure, in Tari TariSamson, Prince Phillip's horse from Disney's Sleeping BeautySpirit from She-RaSpirit, the stallion from Spirit: Stallion of the CimarronStarlight and Skydancer, from Rainbow BriteTempest,  Princess Sissi's horse from the show of the same name
Thowra, the Silver Brumby in The Silver Brumby cartoon series
Yato, from Legend of BasaraHorses in comics
Alsan, from Red RiverArabesque, Blutch's horse in Les Tuniques Bleues, whom he has trained to fall down during battle so he can act as if he is wounded and thus survive the battles.
Basashi, from K -Memory of Red- and K -Days of Blue-Billy Boy, in Bamse by Rune Andréasson
Blue Horse and Brown Horse, two programmers from the web comic horse++Comet, Supergirl's pet horse
Godasse, horse of the French soldier Godaille in the comics series Godaille et Godasse by Jacques Sandron.
Het Gouden Paard, a horse whose skin is gold. Appears in the Suske en Wiske story Het Gouden Paard.
Hero, the fastest horse in the world; owned by The Phantom.
Hirnu the pony, the protagonist of Hirnu, a Finnish comic strip by Joonas.
Hortense, Scrooge McDuck's horse in The Life and Times of Scrooge McDuck by Don Rosa
Jolly Jumper, Lucky Luke's horse and friend in Lucky Luke.
Little Thunder, the personal pony of YakariLucy, pet horse and special friend to Danae in Wiley Miller's Non SequiturMidori no MakibaōNightmare, from Casper the Friendly Ghost.
Rik Drie ("Rik Three"). A horse of Nero in the story "Het Geheim van Bakkendoen" ("The Secret of Bakkendoen"). It turns invisible due to a serum. Nero named him "Rik Three", because "he is even greater than Rik One and Rik Two"  (Cyclist champions Rik Van Steenbergen and Rik Van Looy were popularly nicknamed "Rik One" and "Rik Two", because they were active around the same time.)
Rin Sohma in the form of a horse, from Fruits Basket.
Het Rijmende Paard ("The Rhyming Horse"). He is the horse of Saint Martin of Tours on Antoon van Dyck's famous painting. In the Suske en Wiske album "Het Rijmende Paard" he is brought alive and escapes, causing the protagonists to start a search for him.
Ruby. The horse of cowboy Jerry Spring.
Slow Dancer, fictional Appaloosa of Johnny Joestar from Steel Ball Run
Steve, the carthorse in Roland Davies' comic strip Come On, Steve.
Spark Plug. He is the horse of Barney Google.
Thunder. He is the horse of Red Ryder.
Troy. The family's horse in The Timbertoes.

Horses in song
Badger, a possibly unrideable horse in the song "The Scene We All Ain't Saw" by Chris LeDoux
Becky, the mule from Carl Perkins' Movie Magg.
Bottle of Smoke, the eponymous horse in the song by The Pogues
The Brute, a horse ridden for the first time in the song "The Continental Suit"
Chestnut Mare, the eponymous horse in the song by The Byrds
Feitlebaum, the racehorse who always comes up from behind to finish first (even in a car race) in songs by Doodles Weaver (performed with Spike Jones and his City Slickers)
Galway Bay, the 'coal-black mare with a white starred chest' in the song "The Galway Farmer" by Steve Knightly of Show of Hands
Henry the Horse, the waltzing horse from The Beatles' "Being for the Benefit of Mr. Kite" (based on a real horse called Zanthus, from Pablo Fanque's Circus Royal)
The Horse With No Name, the horse in the eponymous song by America
Lisette, crazed horse in the song "Run Lisette" by Glass Hammer
Mac, from Mason Proffit's "Two Hangmen"
Molly O'Brian and Tenbrooks, who raced in the song "The Ballad of Molly and Tenbrooks" written by Bill Monroe
The Old Gray Mare, the horse in the eponymous song
Old Red, a bucking bronc who'd never been ridden in the eponymous song by Chris LeDoux
Paul Revere, the horse from the song of the same name, Paul Revere, by the Beastie BoysEen paard in de gang, a horse which somehow ended up in neighbour Jansen's hallway. From the eponymous song by comedian André van Duin.
Pinto the wonder horse from the song by Tom T. Hall.
Seven Horses in the Sky, seven horses who appeared in the sky, according to the 1969 eponymous hit song by The Pebbles.
Sorrow, the name of the carnie's horse in the Nick Cave & The Bad Seeds song "The Carnie"
Stewball, from the eponymous song by Peter, Paul and Mary
The Strawberry Roan, an unrideable horse in the eponymous song performed by Marty Robbins, Chris LeDoux, and others
The Tennessee Stud, the horse in the eponymous song written by Jimmy Driftwood and later covered by Johnny Cash.
Trigger, the horse who pulled the fastest milkcart in the West in Benny Hill's Ernie (The Fastest Milkman in the West).
Wildfire, the horse in the eponymous song by Michael Martin Murphey
The Yellow Stud, an unrideable horse in the eponymous song performed by Chris LeDoux

Horses in video games
Aaron, a merhorse/seahorse monster in Undertale
Agro, the horse of Wander, and Phaedra, the 4th Colossus in Shadow of the ColossusArvak, a skeletal horse with blue flames in The Elder Scrolls V: Skyrim, obtained after completing the "Soul Cairn Horse Quest"
"The Boss's Horse", an Andalusian horse who appears in Metal Gear Solid 3: Snake Eater, in Metal Gear Solid 4: Guns of the Patriots (as a painting), and in Metal Gear Solid: Peace Walker as the temporary steed of Big Boss
Butt Stallion in Borderlands 2, a pure diamond horse owned by Handsome Jack
Despair, horse of Death in Darksiders IIEpona, Link's horse in The Legend of Zelda: Ocarina of Time, The Legend of Zelda: Majora's Mask and The Legend of Zelda: Twilight Princess. She also appears The Legend of Zelda: Breath of the Wild as a special horse obtained via the amiibo Rune. 
Frost, a breeding stallion in V: Skyrim, obtained after completing the quest "Promises to Keep"
Geryon, demon horse in Devil May Cry 3Hudson Horstachio, Viva PinataInvincible, undead steed of Arthas, the Lich King in World of Warcraft.
Ixion, one of Yuna's summons from Final Fantasy XKage (Shadow), Nobu (Trust) and Sora (Sky), each a starter horse from Ghost of TsushimaMary Lou, Hank Hoffman Jr.'s horse in Dragon Quest IV, who pulls the party's wagon; in the original NES release, she is named Primrose
Matsukaze, from the video game series Samurai WarriorsOld Gary, the rotten old horse from Peasant's QuestRed Hare, from the video game series Dynasty WarriorsRuin, horse of War in DarksidersShadowmere, a black horse with red eyes in The Elder Scrolls IV: Oblivion and V: Skyrim, obtained after joining the Dark Brotherhood
Smith, Iolo's horse in the Ultima'' series, who talks and can give clues
Torrent, a spirit steed bearing a set of horns given to the protagonist by Melina in Elden Ring

Horses in toys
Several Beanie Babies
Breyer horses
Grand Champions
Horseland
My Little Pony
Papo
Schleich

See also
List of unicorns
Winged horse
Winged unicorn
List of fictional horse trainers
List of historical horses

References

Horses
Horses, fictional
Lists of horses